Wong Jack-man (born 1941 – December 26, 2018) was a Chinese martial artist and teacher. He was best known for his controversial duel with Bruce Lee in 1964.

Early life
Born in 1941 in Hong Kong, Wong was a master of Taijiquan, Xingyiquan and Northern Shaolin.

Fight with Bruce Lee
Accounts of Wong's fight with Lee are controversial, as it was unrecorded and held privately at Chinatown, Oakland in 1964, when both men were in their early 20s.

According to Linda Lee Cadwell, Bruce Lee's wife, Lee's teaching of Chinese martial arts to white people made him unpopular with Chinese martial artists in San Francisco.  Wong contested the notion that Lee was fighting for the right to teach whites as most of his students were Chinese.  Wong stated that he requested a public fight with Lee after Lee had issued an open challenge during a demonstration at a Chinatown theater in which he claimed to be able to defeat any martial artist in San Francisco.  Wong stated it was after a mutual acquaintance delivered a note from Lee inviting him to fight that he showed up at Lee's school to challenge him.

According to author Norman Borine, Wong wanted to know the rules of the match and the restrictions on techniques such as hitting the face, groin kicks, and eye jabs, and that the two fought no holds barred after he received no reply from Lee.

The details of the fight vary depending on the account.  Individuals known to have witnessed the match included Cadwell, James Lee (an associate of Bruce Lee, no relation) and William Chen, a teacher of T'ai chi ch'uan.  According to Linda, the fight lasted three minutes with a decisive victory for Bruce.

Lee gave a description, without naming Wong explicitly, in an interview with Black Belt.

"I'd gotten into a fight in San Francisco with a Kung-Fu cat, and after a brief encounter the son-of-a-bitch started to run. I chased him and, like a fool, kept punching him behind his head and back. Soon my fists began to swell from hitting his hard head. Right then I realized Wing Chun was not too practical and began to alter my way of fighting."

Cadwell recounted the scene in her book Bruce Lee: The Man Only I Knew (1975):

"The two came out, bowed formally and then began to fight. Wong adopted a classic stance whereas Bruce, who at the time was still using his Wing Chun style, produced a series of straight punches. Within a minute, Wong's men were trying to stop the fight as Bruce began to warm to his task. James Lee warned them to let the fight continue. A minute later, with Bruce continuing the attack in earnest, Wong began to backpedal as fast as he could. For an instant, indeed, the scrap threatened to degenerate into a farce as Wong actually turned and ran. But Bruce pounced on him like a springing leopard and brought him to the floor where he began pounding him into a state of demoralization. "Is that enough?" shouted Bruce, "That's enough!" pleaded his adversary. Bruce demanded a second reply to his question to make sure that he understood this was the end of the fight."

This is in contrast to Wong and William Chen's account of the fight as they state the fight lasted an unusually long 20–25 minutes. Wong was unsatisfied with Lee's account of the match and published his own version in the Chinese Pacific Weekly, a Chinese language newspaper in San Francisco.  The article, which was featured on the front page, included a detailed description of the fight by Wong, concluding with an invitation for a public rematch if Lee found his account inaccurate or disingenuous. Lee made no public response to the article, closed his school and moved from the area shortly thereafter.

In Bruce Lee: A Life by Matthew Polly, who shares a few insights from his extensive research and interview process, he says that according to David Chin, who arranged the match on Wong's behalf, Lee overwhelmed Wong with his opening series of attacks as Wong was approaching for the customary salute, causing Wong to turn his back and run. Lee chased him around the room until Wong tripped and fell. Lee jumped on top of Wong and rained down punches, forcing Chin to intervene and rescue Wong.

Wong later expressed regret over fighting Lee, attributing it to arrogance, both on the part of Lee and himself.

Later life and death
Wong instructed classes in California at the Fort Mason Center in San Francisco and at the First Unitarian Church in Oakland for the better part of five decades before retiring in 2005. Wong Jack-man's top two students continue his legacy of teaching. In San Francisco, Rick Wing who took over his teacher's school after his retirement in December 2005 teaches classes at a private location. In San Rafael and San Anselmo in Marin County, California, Scott Jensen runs the 10,000 Victories School that teaches Wong Jack-man's arts. In Oakland, California, The EBM Kung Fu Academy teaches Wong's lineage.

Wong died in California on December 26, 2018.

See also
 Birth of the Dragon

References

Sources

1941 births
2018 deaths
Shaolinquan practitioners
Chinese tai chi practitioners
American people of Chinese descent
Hong Kong martial artists